Ukraine competed at the 2019 Summer Universiade in Naples, Italy, that was held from 3 to 14 July 2019. 160 Ukrainian athletes competed in archery, athletics, basketball, diving, fencing, football, gymnastics, judo, swimming, taekwondo, tennis, and volleyball. Ukraine was not represented in rugby sevens, sailing, shooting, table tennis and water polo. The team won 20 medals, 6 of which were gold, and for the first time finished outside Top-10.

Medal summary

Medal by sports

Medalists

References

External links 
 Official website

Nations at the 2019 Summer Universiade
Summer U
2019